The flat Earth is the idea that the Earth is flat.

Flat Earth may also refer to:

Beliefs
 Modern flat Earth beliefs, beliefs and organizations that claim the Earth is flat
 Myth of the flat Earth, the modern misconception that the prevailing cosmological view during the Middle Ages saw the Earth as flat

Books

Non-fiction 
Flat Earth News (book), non-fiction book by Nick Davies about malpractice on Fleet Street
Inventing the Flat Earth, a non-fiction book debunking the myth of the flat Earth

Fiction 

 Flatland, a novella about a fictional two-dimensional world
 Tales from the Flat Earth, a series of fantasy novels by Tanith Lee

Music
 Flat Earth Society (band), a Belgian big band ensemble
 The Flat Earth, a 1984 album by Thomas Dolby

Other uses
 Flat Earth Productions, a special effects production company
 Flat Earth Crisps, a food manufactured by Frito-Lay
 Flat Earth FC, a former Spanish football team
 A flat Earth strategy, another name for a concept-driven strategy
This Flat Earth, a 2018 play by Lindsey Ferrentino

See also
 Flat Earth News (disambiguation)
Flat Earth Society (disambiguation)
 Flat World Knowledge, a publisher of college-level textbooks and educational supplements
 The World Is Flat (disambiguation)